Moths of the Maldives represent about 83 known moth species. The moths (mostly nocturnal) and butterflies (mostly diurnal) together make up the taxonomic order Lepidoptera.

About 130 species of insects (including arachnids, flies and ants) have been recorded from the Maldives. In addition, more than 67 butterfly species have been identified.

This is a list of moth species which have been recorded on the Maldives.

Choreutidae
Anthophila submarginalis (Walker, 1865)
Choreutis ophiosema

Crambidae
Bradina admixtalis (Walker, 1859)
Cirrhochrista annulifera
Conogethes punctiferalis
Diaphania indica (Saunders, 1851)
Diasemia accalis
Eurrhyparodes tricoloralis (Zeller, 1852)
Glyphodes bivitralis Guenée, 1854
Glyphodes caesalis
Haritalodes derogata (Fabricius, 1775)
Hellula undalis
Hydriris ornatalis (Duponchel, 1832)
Ischnurges gratiosalis (Walker, 1859)
Lamprosema niphealis (Walker, 1859)
Leucinodes orbonalis Guenée, 1854
Maruca vitrata
Omiodes diemenalis (Guenée, 1854)
Panalipa immeritalis (Walker, 1859)
Parapoynx stagnalis (Zeller, 1852)
Parapoynx fluctuosalis (Guenée, 1854)
Parotis suralis (Lederer, 1863)
Psara acrospila (Meyrick, 1886)
Rehimena surusalis
Sameodes cancellalis
Spoladea recurvalis (Fabricius, 1775)
Syllepte penthodes (Meyrick, 1902)

Erebidae
Anomis sabulifera
Asota caricae
Chalciope mygdon (Cramer, 1777)
Eublemma cochylioides
Eudocima materna
Euproctis fraterna 
Euproctis varians (Walker, 1855)
Hydrillodes lentalis Guenée, 1854
Hypena indicatalis Walker, 1859
Hypena jussalis Walker, 1859
Hypena laceratalis 
Maliattha signifera (Walker, 1857)
Mocis frugalis
Mocis undata
Ophiusa coronata (Fabricius, 1775)
Pantydia metaspila (Walker, 1857)
Rhynchina obliqualis
Simplicia robustalis Guenée, 1854
Utetheisa lotrix
Utetheisa pulchella (Linnaeus, 1758)
Utetheisa pulchelloides

Geometridae
Cyclophora anulifera (Hampson, 1893)
Hyperythra lutea (Stoll, 1781)
Mixocera parvulata (Walker, 1863)
Pelagodes antiquadraria (Inoue, 1976)
Racotis boarmiaria (Guenée, 1857)
Scopula actuaria (Walker, 1861)
Scopula addictaria (Walker, 1861)
Scopula aspilataria (Walker, 1861)
Scopula caesaria (Walker, 1861)

Hyblaeidae
Hyblaea puera (Cramer, 1777)

Limacodidae
Darna furva 
Natada sericea (Hampson, 1893)

Noctuidae
Aletia consanguis (Guenée, 1852)
Anticarsia irrorata
Athetis obtusa (Hampson, 1891)
Chasmina candida (Walker, 1865)
Chasmina tibialis (Fabricius, 1775)
Chrysodeixis permissa (Walker, 1858)
Gesonia obeditalis
Helicoverpa assulta
Polytela gloriosae (Fabricius, 1781)
Spodoptera exigua
Thyas honesta
Thysanoplusia orichalcea

Nolidae
Earias vittella
Nola squalida Staudinger, 1870

Pterophoridae
Sphenarches caffer (Zeller, 1851)

Pyralidae
Endotricha mesenterialis (Walker, 1859)
Epicrocis lateritialis (Walker, 1863)
Melathrix praetextella (Christoph, 1877)

Scythrididae
Scythris atollicola Nupponen, Saldaitis & Fischer, 2013

Sphingidae
Acherontia styx
Agrius convolvuli
Cephonodes hylas (Linnaeus, 1771)
Cephonodes picus
Macroglossum gyrans Walker, 1856
Macroglossum sitiene Walker, 1856
Macroglossum svetlana Eitschberger & Fischer, 2009
Xylophanes thyelia (Linnaeus, 1758)

Stathmopodidae
Stathmopoda auriferella

Thyrididae
Striglina scitaria (Walker, 1863)

Tortricidae
Adoxophyes euryomis Meyrick, 1902
Dudua aprobola
Statherotis leucaspis (Meyrick, 1902)

References

External links
AfroMoths

'moths
Moths
Maldives
Maldives